The 1999 Bausch & Lomb Championships was a women's tennis tournament played on outdoor clay courts at the Amelia Island Plantation on Amelia Island, Florida in the United States that was part of Tier II of the 1999 WTA Tour. It was the 20th edition of the tournament and was held from April 5 through April 11, 1999. Monica Seles won the singles title.

Finals

Singles

 Monica Seles defeated  Ruxandra Dragomir, 6–2, 6–3

Doubles

 Conchita Martínez /  Patricia Tarabini defeated  Lisa Raymond /  Rennae Stubbs, 7–5, 0–6, 6–4

Entrants

Seeds

Other entrants
The following players received wildcards into the singles main draw:
  Inés Gorrochategui
  Jessica Steck
  Meilen Tu

The following players received entry from the singles qualifying draw:
  Tina Pisnik
  Sandra Načuk
  Jana Nejedly
  Sonya Jeyaseelan
  María José Gaidano
  Nadia Petrova
  Larissa Schaerer
  Emmanuelle Gagliardi

The following players received entry as a lucky loser:
  Evgenia Kulikovskaya
  Alexandra Stevenson

References

External links
 ITF tournament edition details

Bausch and Lomb Championships
Amelia Island Championships
Bausch and Lomb Championships
Bausch and Lomb Championships
Bausch and Lomb Championships